Vicky Harris is a Greek and American actress, voice-over artist, writer and translator. In film, she is most notable for her roles in See You in Hell, My Darling and The Zero Years by Nikos Nikolaidis.

Life and career
Harris was born in New York and raised in the United States, living between New York, Boston, Los Angeles, Athens, Greece and Paris, France. She initially aspired to become a writer and while having been granted a four-year scholarship from Boston University, she began her studies in English Literature before developing a career in acting. She then went on to collaborate with some of Greece’s most prominent directors, most notably starring in Nikos Nikolaidis' critically acclaimed films See You in Hell, My Darling and The Zero Years for which Variety writes: "Harris dominates with her poised playing: When she's off-screen in the latter stages, the temperature dips."

Known also for her voice-over work in both English and Greek, she has voiced countless commercials, narrations and audio books. Her major credits include dubbing Irène Jacob in English for Theo Angelopoulos' The Dust of Time, providing the Greek voice for both The Other Goose and Tourist in the film Rio(2011) and playing the characters of Bloody Mary and University student in the video game Conspiracies.

Harris continues to write and she regularly works as a translator.
She is a member of the Hellenic Film Academy.

Filmography

References

External links

21st-century Greek actresses
Actresses from Athens
Greek film actresses
Living people
Year of birth missing (living people)